The New Zealand cricket team toured England in the 1973 season to play a three-match Test series against England. England won the series 2–0 with 1 match drawn.

Test series summary

First Test

Second Test

Third Test

Prudential Trophy

First ODI

Second ODI

External sources
 CricketArchive – tour itineraries

Annual reviews
 Playfair Cricket Annual 1974
 Wisden Cricketers' Almanack 1974

Further reading
 Bill Frindall, The Wisden Book of Test Cricket 1877-1978, Wisden, 1979

1973 in New Zealand cricket
1973 in English cricket
1973
International cricket competitions from 1970–71 to 1975